Hermann Stadium, or fully, Robert R. Hermann Stadium is located in Midtown St. Louis, Missouri, on the campus of Saint Louis University. The first game played was August 21, 1999.  This is where both the Billiken men's and women's soccer teams play.  Also, several other events take place here, such as pep rallies and the University's Relay For Life. The seating capacity of the stadium is 6,050. The stadium is named after Bob Hermann.

The Billikens play on a regulation 120x75-yard soccer pitch.

Past and future events

 2000 Conference USA Women's Soccer Championships
 2000 Conference USA Men's Soccer Championships
 2002 Conference USA Men's Soccer Championships
 2004 Conference USA Women's Soccer Championships
 2005 Atlantic 10 Men's Soccer Championships
 2006 Atlantic 10 Women's Soccer Championships
 2006 NCAA Men's College Cup
 2009 Superliga match between Kansas City Wizards and Atlas
 2011 Atlantic 10 Men's Soccer Championships
 2013 Warm up arena for the Bosnia and Herzegovina national football team

History
The Billiken men's team christened Hermann Stadium by knocking off defending national champion and preseason No. 1 Indiana 3–2 in an exhibition game on Aug. 21, 1999, before a record on-campus crowd of 6,517.

See also
 Soccer in St. Louis

Saint Louis Billikens soccer
Sports venues in St. Louis
Sports venues completed in 1999
Soccer venues in Missouri
College soccer venues in the United States
Sports venues in Missouri
1999 establishments in Missouri